A garrison  (from the French garnison, itself from the verb garnir, "to equip") is any body of troops stationed in a particular location, originally to guard it. The term now often  applies to certain facilities that constitute a  military base or fortified military headquarters.
A garrison is usually in a city, town, fort, castle, ship,  or similar site. "Garrison town" is a common expression for any town that has a military base nearby.

"Garrison towns" were used during the Arab Islamic conquests of Middle Eastern lands by Arab-Muslim armies to increase their dominance over indigenous populations. In order to occupy non-Arab, non-Islamic areas, nomadic Arab tribesmen were taken from the desert by the ruling Arab elite, conscripted into Islamic armies, and settled into garrison towns as well as given a share in the spoils of war. The primary utility of the Arab-Islamic garrisons was to control the indigenous non-Arab peoples of these conquered and occupied territories, and to serve as garrison bases to launch further Islamic military campaigns into yet-undominated lands. A secondary aspect of the Arab-Islamic garrisons was the uprooting of the aforementioned nomadic Arab tribesmen from their original home regions in the Arabian Peninsula in order to proactively avert these tribal peoples, and particularly their young men, from revolting against the Islamic state established in their midst.

In the United Kingdom, "Garrison" also specifically refers to any of the major military stations such as Aldershot, Catterick, Colchester, Tidworth, Bulford, and London, which have more than one barracks or camp and their own military headquarters, usually commanded by a colonel, brigadier or major-general, assisted by a garrison sergeant major. In Ireland, Association football (as distinct from Gaelic football) has historically been termed the "garrison game" or the "garrison sport" for its connections with British military serving in Irish cities and towns.

See also
List of British Army Garrisons
Static infantry division

References

External links
Nouveau petit Larousse illustré, 1952 (French encyclopedic dictionary)

Military units and formations by type
Barracks